WIDR (89.1 FM) is a freeform FM radio station that broadcasts from Western Michigan University in Kalamazoo, Michigan. WIDR, a student-run radio station licensed to Western Michigan University, broadcasts with 100 watts of power. The station is entirely student-run, employing six part-time staff members. Staff members must be students at Western Michigan University, enrolled at least part-time. Even though the station is student-run, a number of community volunteers hold on-air positions as well.

History
The station originally began broadcasting in 1952, as a carrier current station. The station was started by a small group of students including Jack Clifford, who later went on to found the Food Network. The station broadcast through the pipes of Western Michigan University; specifically throughout the dormitories. Thus, they picked as their call letters W.I.D.R., or Western Inter-Dormitory Radio.

For the first 23 years, WIDR broadcast as an AM station at 750 kHz. In 1975, the student-staff filed paperwork with the Federal Communications Commission (FCC) to become an FM station. They were given a frequency of 89.1 MHz, and allowed to broadcast at a power of 100 watts. WIDR is classified by the FCC as a non-commercial, educational station.

Today, the station goes by the moniker WIDR (pronounced "wider") and continues to serve both Western Michigan University and the Kalamazoo community.

Programming
WIDR's programming consists of a combination of variety music shows, specialty music shows and public affairs shows.

Variety music shows draw music from within the WIDR's own music library. The library comprises mainly CDs and Vinyl from a number of non-mainstream or alternative record labels and represents styles ranging from alternative, jazz and hip-hop to electronic, world and experimental music.

Experienced DJs are allowed to develop programming focusing on specific genres of music. Programs such as "The Outhouse" Radio Program (County), "Birdland" (Jazz), "The Splatterhouse" (Industrial) and "WIDR World" (World) are some examples of these programs.

Some DJs choose, instead of a specialty music program, to develop a public affairs program. These are generally talk or interview-based programs focusing on subjects from current events to local culture.

Funding
WIDR gets its funding primarily through Western Michigan University, though significant contributions are made by community members and WIDR alumni.

Western Michigan University holds the license to WIDR, and as such provides WIDR with mostly in-kind services. These include the use of on-campus office space, electricity, internet access and the like.

WIDR runs an event every year called WIDR Week. During this event, the station solicits donations from its listeners and runs a number of local events.

Special events
WIDR hosts a number of special events every year on Western Michigan University's campus and in the city of Kalamazoo.

The main event each year is the WIDR Block Party. This event takes place in the community, and has been going on since 2012. Past WIDR festivals included Barking Tuna Festival and Kite Flight.

Past BTF headliners have included The New Pornographers, Spoon, Mission of Burma, Stephen Malkmus, Mates of State, RJD2, Tiny Lights, The New Duncan Imperials, Dan Deacon, Lighting Bolt, and King Khan & The Shrines.

References
Michiguide.com - WIDR History
WIDR Alumni Society

External links
WIDR website

IDR
Western Michigan University
Radio stations established in 1952
IDR